Yommarat is a Thai noble title historically given to the minister of the Krom Mueang or Nakhonban, one of the four ministries under the chatusadom system, charged with keeping the peace in the capital. Holders of the title were usually given the high rank of phraya or chaophraya.

List of titleholders
Past holders of the title include:

During the Thonburi period:
Phraya Yommarat (Baen) – Later became Chaophraya Aphaiphubet.

During the Rattanakosin period

Phraya Yommarat (In) – Named by King Rama I when he assumed the throne and founded the Chakri Dynasty in 1782. Stripped of the title as punishment for mistakes made in the Burmese–Siamese War (1785–1786).
Chaophraya Yommarat (Bunnag) – Named following the war; later became Chaophraya Mahasena, the samuhakalahom.
Chaophraya Yommarat (Bunma) – Later became Chaophraya Mahasena.
Chaophraya Yommarat (Noi Punyaratabandhu) – Served King Rama II; later became Chaophraya Aphaiphuthon, the samuhanayok.
Chaophraya Yommarat (Noi Sisuriyaphaha) – Later became Chaophraya Mahasena under King Rama III.
Chaophraya Yommarat (Phun) – Served King Rama III.
Chaophraya Yommarat (Chim) – Served King Rama III.
Chaophraya Yommarat (Bunnag) – Served King Rama III; progenitor of the Yamanaga family.
Chaophraya Yommarat (Suk) – A grandson of Prince Inthraphithak (son of King Taksin); named to the post in 1851, died 1855.
Chaophraya Yommarat (Nut Punyaratabandhu) – Later became Chaophraya Phutharaphai, the samuhanayok, in 1863.
Chaophraya Yommarat (Khrut) – Born 1808, held the title from 1864 until his death the next year.
Chaophraya Yommarat (Kaeo) – Son of Chaophraya Bodindecha; born 1804, died 1871.
Chaophraya Yommarat (Choei) – Held the title from 1871 until his death in 1881; progenitor of the Yamabhaya family.

Following the death of Chaophraya Yommarat (Choei), the title was left vacant, as the government was undergoing structural reforms abolishing the chatusadom system. A committee of four officials was established to oversee its functions in the interim period, before a modern ministry was re-established, named Krasuang Nakhonban or the Ministry of Metropolitan Affairs, in 1892. Prince Nares Varariddhi was named the first minister. In 1907, he was succeeded by Phraya Sukhumnaiwinit, who was named Chaophraya Yommarat (Pan Sukhum) the following year. He was the last holder of the title; the ministry was subsumed into the Ministry of Interior in 1922.

References

Thai titles of nobility
Lists of political office-holders in Thailand